Ned Romeyn Healy (August 9, 1905 – September 10, 1977) was a member of the Los Angeles City Council from 1943 to 1945 and a member of Congress from 1945 to 1947.

Biography 
Healy was born August 9, 1905, in Milwaukee, Wisconsin, where he attended public schools and Marquette University. He also studied at the University of Wisconsin–Madison, in which city he was a stock and bond salesman from 1929 until he moved to Los Angeles in 1932, where he was in merchandising and office management. He was director of the Hollywood office of the California State Relief Administration in 1939 and 1940. After his Congressional service ended in 1943, he returned to Los Angeles, where he became a dealer in auto parts and accessories until 1969. Healy died September 10, 1977. His body was cremated and the ashes scattered at sea.

Political life 
Healy was a delegate to the Democratic State Convention in 1944, 1946 and 1948.

City Council

Election 

In 1943 Los Angeles City Council District 13 lay south and west of Downtown Los Angeles, bounded roughly on the east by Sheffield Street, the south by Valley Boulevard, the west by Vermont Avenue and the north by an irregular line from Pullman Street to Fountain Avenue.

Healy ran for election in District 13 against the incumbent, Roy Hampton.
In the heat of the campaign, Hampton made a charge in 30,000 fliers circulated "on the eve of the municipal primary" that Healy had at one time been a registered member of the Communist Party. Healy went to the city attorney's office and demanded issuance of a complaint against Hampton for criminal libel, and Hampton quickly made an "unequivocal retraction" of his charge. The record does not show whether Hampton had confused Ned R. Healy with local labor leader Don R. Healy, whom Hampton had accused of being a communist just three years previous.

Another challenger was Kay Cunningham, who missed beating Ned Healy for second place and a runoff position by only 18 votes.

Healy went on to victory over Hampton in the 1943 runoff vote, but he quit the council in 1944 after winning election to the House of Representatives that fall. The City Council decided to leave the seat unfilled until the next municipal vote, in 1945.

Positions 
Healy was a New Dealer who in 1943 unsuccessfully opposed granting a permit to Seaboard Oil Company for slant oil drilling under Elysian Park from a site near Riverside Drive.

He also fought for a December 1943 resolution honoring Bill of Rights Week that would have put the council on record as opposed to discrimination "against minority groups" and encouraging broadest "racial" unity. Other members of the council objected to those two terms, and, after a two-hour debate, they were eventually deleted and the motion was adopted, 10-5, in opposition to any form of discrimination and in favor of general unity and tolerance.

U.S. House of Representatives

References 
Access to the Los Angeles Times links may require the use of a library card.

1905 births
1977 deaths
University of Wisconsin–Madison alumni
Democratic Party members of the United States House of Representatives from California
Los Angeles City Council members
Politicians from Milwaukee
Politicians from Los Angeles
20th-century American politicians